Berezovka is a rural locality (a selo) and the administrative center of Beryozovskoye Rural Settlement, Yelansky District, Volgograd Oblast, Russia. The population was 406 as of 2010. There are 8 streets.

Geography 
The village is located on Khopyorsko-Buzulukskaya Plain, on the Beryozovaya River, 340 km from Volgograd and 23 km from Yelan.

References 

Rural localities in Yelansky District